The Norwegian Reservist Association is an interest organisation for military reserve officers in Norway.

It was established as the Conscript Officers' Association in 1896, changed its name to Norwegian Reserve Officers’ Association (NROF) in 1975. Another name change happened in 2022, while keeping the old abbreviation NROF. The association is a political independent organization, consists of 57 local branches nationwide, with about 7000 members in total.

NROF's goal is to unite officers in a union where members can debate official defense issues, develop their military skills and participate in a variety of military sports. This in order to support the Norwegian armed forces, and maintain the reservists knowledge.

To have fully competent reserve-officers able to handle national crisis and international service is NROF's vision. The association wishes to promote Norwegian interests in matters of national security and issues surrounding the Armed Forces.

Norwegian citizens who serve, or have served in the Armed Forces, can all be members of the Norwegian Reservist Association. It publishes the magazine Pro Patria. President is Jørn Buø, and the organizational headquarters are in Oslo.

His Majesty King Harald the fifth is the organizations protector.

See also 
 Finnish Reservist Sports Federation and SRA-shooting

References

External links
Official site

Military of Norway
Organizations established in 1896
Organisations based in Oslo
1896 establishments in Norway